The Principia is an educational institution for Christian Scientists located on two campuses in the St. Louis, Missouri metropolitan area of the United States. Principia School, located in Town and Country, West St. Louis County, serves students from early childhood through high school, and Principia College, located about thirty miles away, is on the bluffs overlooking the Mississippi River in Elsah, Illinois.

History 
Founded by Mary Kimball Morgan, Principia School was officially opened in 1898 in St. Louis. By 1906, Principia had graduated its first high school class and in 1912, the Junior College was added, becoming one of the first such colleges in America. The year 1917 marked the first graduation ceremony of alumni from the Junior College. In 1934 Principia College awarded its first bachelor's degrees. Principia College students moved to Elsah, Illinois, in February, 1935. Principia School later moved to its current location in the St. Louis suburb of Town and Country, Missouri in 1959.

Connection with other schools

When two other schools began, Claremont Fan Court School and Huntingtower School, they used the ideas which Principia is founded on as an example.

Institutions

Principia School
All three schools of Principia School are located on a 360-acre campus in the St. Louis suburb of Town and Country. Principia School follows a British-style organization and as such its schools are as follows:
 Lower School
 Middle School
 Upper School

Principia College

Principia College is a private liberal-arts undergraduate college located on the bluffs of the Mississippi River in Elsah, Illinois. The college does not offer graduate programs. The school offers various B.A. and B.S. majors, comprehensive experiential programs, study abroad and field programs, includes a high participation in athletic programs, and is remarkable for its small size. Distinguished architect, Bernard R. Maybeck, of Maybeck and White, worked through his largest design commission during the original construction phases of Principia College. Principia College was designated a National Historic Landmark and placed on the Registrar of Historic Places in 1993.

Alumni
Notable Principia Alumni. (US) refers to Principia Upper School and (C) refers to Principia College. For another list of Principia College Alumni refer to Principia College. 
Larry Groce (C), American singer-songwriter and radio host.
Robert Duvall (US, C), American actor and filmmaker; Academy Award and Golden Globe Awards nominee.
Ngozi Mwanamwambwa (C), Zambian sprinter.
Joy Osmanski (C), American actress.
Christie Enke (C), American chemist.
Chris Shays (C), former United States representative. 
David Lovegren (US, C), Film producer.
Ron Charles (US, C), Book critic.
Peter Horton (attended C) — Actor and Movie director.
Candy Crowley (attended C), American news anchor.
Egil Krogh (US, C), American lawyer.
Dean Smith (attended C), American pioneer pilot.
David Rowland (C), American industrial designer.
Robert Bruegmann (C), historian.
Chandler Burr (C), American journalist and author.
Charles Remington (C), American entomologist.
John Andrews (US, C), American politician.
Ketti Frings (attended C), American author, playwright, and screenwriter.
Ann Dunnigan (attended C), American actor and translator.
Arend Lijphart (C), Political scientist.
Aaron Goldsmith (US, C), American sportscaster.
Steve Sydness, American politician.
Joe Fitzgibbon (US, C), American politician.
Yaw Danso (US'06, C'10), Ghanaian footballer.

References

External links 
 Official website

 
Christian Science in Missouri
Educational institutions established in 1898
Elementary schools in St. Louis County, Missouri
High schools in St. Louis County, Missouri
Middle schools in St. Louis County, Missouri
Private schools in St. Louis County, Missouri
Private K-12 schools in Missouri
1898 establishments in Missouri